Chris Diamond (born December 30, 1963) is an American professional stock car racing driver.

Racing Career
Diamond has made 13 NASCAR Busch Series starts. In his debut, he finished 20th, 11 laps down.

Motorsports Career Results

Busch Grand National Series

References

External links
 

1963 births
NASCAR drivers
CARS Tour drivers
Living people
People from Hickory, North Carolina
Racing drivers from North Carolina